Dahlica is a genus of moths belonging to the family Psychidae.

Species:
 Dahlica triquetrella
 Dahlica lichenella
 Dahlica klimeschi
 Dahlica lazuri
 Dahlica charlottae
 Dahlica fennicella

References

Psychidae
Psychidae genera